Marcus Malte (born 1967) is a French author. He received the Prix Femina for Le Garçon in 2016. This book was later translated to English by Emma Ramadan and Tom Roberge, then published as The Boy.

References 

Living people
1967 births
People from La Seyne-sur-Mer
French male novelists
French crime fiction writers
French children's writers
20th-century French novelists
21st-century French novelists
Prix Femina winners
20th-century French male writers
21st-century French male writers